Nouneh Sarkissian (Armenian: , born 1954) is the wife of Armenian President Armen Sarksyan and is the former First Lady of Armenia.

Education
Nouneh Sarkissian graduated from the Department of Romano - Germanic Languages of Yerevan State University. Studied at Goldsmiths College, London University and graduated with MA degree in History of Arts. Received specialization in Art Studies at Sotheby’s Institute of Art. Later, continued her studies in painting and drawing at Westminster College, London.

Professional activities
Nouneh Sarkissian worked at Matenadaran - the Mesrop Mashtots Scientific Research Institute of Ancient Manuscripts.
She has authored multiple essays and reviews on art, culture, and music which were published in Armenia, the United States, and a number of European countries.
She also organized a number of exhibitions and concerts of classical music in different concert halls.
She is the author of more than two dozen children’s books in Armenian, Russian, and English. Some of her fairy tales have been published in Eastern Armenian, Western Armenian as well as in dialects of Artsakh, Gavar and Gyumri.
Some of her fairy tales, such as the Bald Hedgehog, have been staged at the State Puppet Theater and Tzuk Mzuk has been on the stage of Karapet Puppet Theatre.
Nouneh Sarkissian was appointed by UNICEF an extraordinary defender of children.

Honours

Foreign honour
 : Knight Grand Cross of the Order of Merit of the Italian Republic (25 July 2018)

Notes

References

1954 births
First ladies of Armenia
Knights Grand Cross of the Order of Merit of the Italian Republic
Living people
Writers from Yerevan